Vladimir Gershonovich Drinfeld (born February 14, 1954), surname also romanized as Drinfel'd, is a renowned mathematician from the former USSR, who emigrated to the United States and is currently working at the University of Chicago.

Drinfeld's work connected algebraic geometry over finite fields with number theory, especially the theory of automorphic forms, through the notions of elliptic module and the theory of the geometric Langlands correspondence. Drinfeld introduced the notion of a quantum group (independently discovered by Michio Jimbo at the same time) and made important contributions to mathematical physics, including the ADHM construction of instantons, algebraic formalism of the quantum inverse scattering method, and the Drinfeld–Sokolov reduction in the theory of solitons.

He was awarded the Fields Medal in 1990.
In 2016, he was elected to the National Academy of Sciences. In 2018 he received the Wolf Prize in Mathematics.

Biography 
Drinfeld was born into a Jewish mathematical family, in Kharkiv, Ukrainian SSR, Soviet Union in 1954. In 1969, at the age of 15, Drinfeld represented the Soviet Union at the International Mathematics Olympiad in Bucharest, Romania, and won a gold medal with the full score of 40 points. He was, at the time, the youngest participant to achieve a perfect score, a record that has since been surpassed by only four others including Sergei Konyagin and Noam Elkies. Drinfeld entered Moscow State University in the same year and graduated from it in 1974. Drinfeld was awarded the Candidate of Sciences degree in 1978 and the Doctor of Sciences degree from the Steklov Institute of Mathematics in 1988. He was awarded the Fields Medal in 1990. From 1981 till 1999 he worked at the Verkin Institute for Low Temperature Physics and Engineering (Department of Mathematical Physics). Drinfeld moved to the United States in 1999 and has been working at the University of Chicago since January 1999.

Contributions to mathematics 
In 1974, at the age of twenty, Drinfeld announced a proof of the Langlands conjectures for GL2 over a global field of positive characteristic. In the course of proving the conjectures, Drinfeld introduced a new class of objects that he called "elliptic modules" (now known as Drinfeld modules). Later, in 1983, Drinfeld published a short article that expanded the scope of the Langlands conjectures. The Langlands conjectures, when published in 1967, could be seen as a sort of non-abelian class field theory. It postulated the existence of a natural one-to-one correspondence between Galois representations and some automorphic forms. The "naturalness" is guaranteed by the essential coincidence of L-functions. However, this condition is purely arithmetic and cannot be considered for a general one-dimensional function field  in a straightforward way. Drinfeld pointed out that instead of automorphic forms one can consider automorphic perverse sheaves or automorphic D-modules. "Automorphicity" of these modules and the Langlands correspondence could be then understood in terms of the action of Hecke operators.

Drinfeld has also worked in mathematical physics. In collaboration with his advisor Yuri Manin, he constructed the moduli space of Yang–Mills instantons, a result that was proved independently by Michael Atiyah and Nigel Hitchin. Drinfeld coined the term "quantum group" in reference to Hopf algebras that are deformations of simple Lie algebras, and connected them to the study of the Yang–Baxter equation, which is a necessary condition for the solvability of statistical mechanical models. He also generalized Hopf algebras to quasi-Hopf algebras and introduced the study of Drinfeld twists, which can be used to factorize the R-matrix corresponding to the solution of the Yang–Baxter equation associated with a quasitriangular Hopf algebra.

Drinfeld has also collaborated with Alexander Beilinson to rebuild the theory of vertex algebras in a coordinate-free form, which have become increasingly important to two-dimensional conformal field theory, string theory, and the  geometric Langlands program.  Drinfeld and Beilinson published their work in 2004 in a book titled "Chiral Algebras."

See also 
Drinfeld reciprocity
Drinfeld upper half plane
Manin–Drinfeld theorem
Quantum group
Chiral algebra
Quasitriangular Hopf algebra
Ruziewicz problem

Notes

References 
 
 Victor Ginzburg, Preface to the special volume of Transformation Groups (vol 10, 3–4, December 2005, Birkhäuser) on occasion of Vladimir Drinfeld's 50th birthday, pp 277–278, 
 Report by Manin

External links 
 
 
 Langlands Seminar homepage

1954 births
20th-century Ukrainian  mathematicians
21st-century Ukrainian  mathematicians
Moscow State University alumni
Fields Medalists
Living people
Algebraic geometers
Number theorists
Soviet mathematicians
Ukrainian Jews
Scientists from Kharkiv
International Mathematical Olympiad participants
University of Chicago faculty
Institute for Advanced Study visiting scholars
Members of the United States National Academy of Sciences